The A-League Men is a professional soccer league in Australia which is at the top of the Australian league system. The league was formed in 2005 as a replacement for the original National Soccer League.

Some of the people have served spells as caretaker (temporary) managers in the period between a managerial departure and appointment. Several caretaker managers such as Tony Walmsley at Central Coast Mariners have gone on to secure a permanent managerial post. , Ernie Merrick, John Aloisi, Mark Rudan and Tony Popovic are the only coaches to have managed more than two A-League Men clubs.

Managers 

The list of managers includes everyone who has managed clubs while they were in the A-League Men, whether in a permanent or temporary role. Caretaker managers are listed only when they managed the team for at least one match in that period.

The dates of appointment and departure may fall outside the club's period in the A-League Men, for example, John Kosmina was appointed as Adelaide United manager in 2003 (before the A-League was formed in 2005) and remained in his position through the league's establishment.

By club

Most games coached in A-League Men

References

External links
 A-League Men official website

 
A-League Men lists